Rahel Rebsamen (born 8 April 1994) is a Swiss bobsledder. She competed in the two-woman event at the 2018 Winter Olympics.

References

External links 
 

1994 births
Living people
Swiss female bobsledders
Olympic bobsledders of Switzerland
Bobsledders at the 2018 Winter Olympics
Place of birth missing (living people)